The following lists events that happened during 2002 in Chile.

Incumbents
President of Chile: Ricardo Lagos

Events

June
2–5 June – Intense rainfall causes the 2002 Northern Chile floods and mudflow that hit Coquimbo and Valparaíso leading to the deaths of 17 people.

September
14–15 September – 2002 South American Race Walking Championships

Deaths
7 June – Anselmo Sule (born 1934)
5 August – Francisco Coloane (born 1910)
23 November – Roberto Matta (born 1911)

References 

 
Years of the 21st century in Chile
Chile